Predrag Mijić (born 5 November 1984) is a Serbian former professional footballer who played as a winger.

Career
During his playing career, Mijić had the most successful period at Spartak Subotica, securing him a transfer to Partizan in the 2010 winter transfer window. He also appeared in the top level leagues of Slovakia and Russia.

References

External links
 
 

Association football midfielders
Expatriate footballers in Russia
Expatriate footballers in Slovakia
FC Amkar Perm players
OFK Bečej 1918 players
FK Cement Beočin players
FK ČSK Čelarevo players
FK Partizan players
FK Spartak Subotica players
MFK Ružomberok players
OFK Beograd players
People from Žabalj
Russian Premier League players
Serbian expatriate footballers
Serbian expatriate sportspeople in Russia
Serbian expatriate sportspeople in Slovakia
Serbian First League players
Serbian footballers
Serbian SuperLiga players
Slovak Super Liga players
1984 births
Living people